Kadaladi is a small village in Kalasapakkam taluk, Tiruvannamalai district, Tamil Nadu, India. The nearby towns are Kalasapakkam, Pudupalayam, Thurinjapuram and Polur.
It comes under Kadalady Panchayath. It is located 26 km north of the district capital. 

The Kadaladi postal code is 606908.

Demographics of Kadaladi 
Kadaladi is a predominantly Tamil-speaking village.

Politics in Kadaladi 
Dravida Munnetra Kazhagam (DMK), AIADMK, Indian National Congress, and Pattali Makkal Katchi are the major political parties in the area. The area is currently represented by Mr. N. Arumugam of the AIADMK.

Education 
 Government Higher Secondary School
 Aided Elementary School (A N M)
 Kamaraj Nursery School
 Panchayat Union Elementary School
 Panchayat Union Elementary School, Mampakkam
 Panchayat Union Elementary School, Melkodi
 Adi Dravidar Welfare Middle School
 Jeganjothi Matric School
 Sri ragavendra nursery & primary school, kadaladi

References 

Villages in Tiruvannamalai district